John Riordan may refer to:

 John Riordan (mathematician) (1903–1988), American mathematician
 John Riordan (banker), American banker, "Oskar Schindler of the Vietnam War"
 John R. Riordan (born 1943), Canadian biochemist
 John Riordan (businessman), Canadian businessman, owner of Riordon Paper Mills and The Toronto Mail (from 1877 to 1895)
 John Riordan (jockey) (1936–2021), New Zealand jockey

See also
 John Riordan Three-Decker, a historic house in Worcester, Massachusetts